Mohammad Zulkernine is a Canadian computer scientist, currently a Canada Research Chair at Queen's University.

References

Year of birth missing (living people)
Living people
Academic staff of Queen's University at Kingston
Canadian computer scientists
University of Waterloo alumni